The Hahn Company, San Diego, California, alternately known as Ernest W. Hahn, Inc., was a major American shopping center owner and developer from the 1950s to the 1980s. Purchased by the Trizec Corp. in 1980 (which then took the name TrizecHahn), it became defunct.

Corporate history
The company was founded and managed by Ernest W. Hahn (1919–1992). During its 30 years of existence the company built 45 shopping malls in 18 states, from Florida to Oregon. Their first major project was the regional shopping mall La Cumbre Plaza in Santa Barbara, California, which opened in 1967. Hahn went on to become the largest mall builder in the West.

The innovative Horton Plaza mall in Downtown San Diego, which opened in 1985, helped lead the rejuvenation of the city's downtown area. It was the first successful downtown retail center since the rise of suburban shopping centers decades earlier. Hahn had previously built the Fashion Valley and Parkway Plaza malls in San Diego.

In 1980 Trizec Corporation, of Toronto, Ontario, acquired the company's shopping center interests.  Trizec took the new name TrizecHahn to reflect the purchase. TrizecHahn exited the shopping center business in 1998. The majority of its properties west of Las Vegas were acquired by Westfield America, Inc. (precursor to The Westfield Group) and those east of Las Vegas by The Rouse Company.

Projects 
 La Cumbre Plaza (1967) - Santa Barbara, California
 Valley Plaza Mall (1967) - Bakersfield, California
 Montclair Plaza (1968) - Montclair, California
 Fashion Valley Mall (1969) - San Diego, California
 Galleria at Tyler (1970) - Riverside, California
 Downtown Plaza (1971; portions of the mall were demolished in 2014 and later redeveloped) - Sacramento, California
 Los Cerritos Center (1971) - Cerritos, California
 Sunrise Mall (1971) - Citrus Heights, California
 Westfield Oakridge (1971) - San Jose, California
 Fashion Place (1972) - Murray, Utah
 Parkway Plaza (1972) - El Cajon, California
 Laguna Hills Mall (1973) - Laguna Hills, California
 Puente Hills Mall (1974) - Industry, California
 Westfield Santa Anita (1974) - Arcadia, California
 Mt. Shasta Mall (1975) - Redding, California
 Rimrock Mall (1975) Billings, Montana
 Newmarket North Mall (1975; redeveloped as NetCenter in 2000) - Hampton, Virginia
 Westfield Culver City (1975) - Culver City, California
 Pueblo Mall (1976) - Pueblo, Colorado
 Capital Mall (1977) - Olympia, Washington
 Hawthorne Plaza Shopping Center (1977) - Hawthorne, California
 Redlands Mall (1977) - Redlands, California
 Vintage Faire Mall (1977) - Modesto, California
 Westfield UTC (1977) - University City, San Diego, California
 Meadows Mall (1978) - Las Vegas, Nevada
 The Oaks (1978) - Thousand Oaks, California
 Santa Maria Town Center (1978) - Santa Maria, California
 Westdale Mall (1979; demolished in 2014 and is currently under redevelopment) - Cedar Rapids, Iowa
 Mesa Mall (1980) - Grand Junction, Colorado
 Ogden City Mall (1980; demolished in 2002 and redeveloped as The Junction) - Ogden, Utah
 Plaza Pasadena (1980; demolished in 1999 and redeveloped into The Paseo in 2001) - Pasadena, California
 Santa Monica Place (1980) - Santa Monica, California
 Clackamas Town Center (1981) - Clackamas, Oregon
 The Courtyard (1981; redeveloped into Promenade on the Peninsula in 1999) - Rolling Hills Estates, California
 San Mateo Fashion Island (1981; demolished in 1996 and redeveloped into Bridgepointe Shopping Center in 1997) - San Mateo, California
 Fashion Show Mall (1981) - Paradise, Nevada
 Mall of Memphis (1981; demolished in 2004) - Memphis, Tennessee
 Solano Town Center (1981) - Fairfield, California
 Long Beach Plaza (1982; demolished in 2000 and redeveloped into Long Beach City Place in 2003) - Long Beach, California
 Westfield Palm Desert (1982) - Palm Desert, California
 Santa Rosa Plaza (1983) - Santa Rosa, California
 The Village at Corte Madera (1985) - Corte Madera, California
 Westfield Horton Plaza (1985) - San Diego, California
 Westfield North County (1986) - Escondido, California
 Westfield Valley Fair (1986) - Santa Clara, California
 Three Rivers Mall (1987) - Kelso, Washington
 Bridgewater Commons (1988) - Bridgewater, New Jersey
 East Hills Mall (1988) - Bakersfield, California
 Sierra Vista Mall (1988) - Clovis, California
 Towson Town Center (1991 expansion wing) - Towson, Maryland
 Prudential Center (1993) - Boston, Massachusetts
 Park Meadows (1996) - Lone Tree, Colorado
 Prizm Outlets (1998) - Primm, Nevada
 Miracle Mile Shops (2000) - Paradise, Nevada
 Ovation Hollywood (2001) - Hollywood, Los Angeles, California

References

Shopping center management firms
Companies based in San Diego